Shigaite is a mineral with formula NaAl3(Mn2+)6(SO4)2(OH)18·12H2O that typically occurs as small, hexagonal crystals or thin coatings. It is named for Shiga Prefecture, Japan, where it was discovered in 1985. The formula was significantly revised in 1996, identifying sodium as a previously unknown constituent.

Description

The mineral can be yellow, burnt orange, brown or black in color. Shigaite occurs in metamorphosed deposits of manganese ore and is the Mn2+ analogue of motukoreaite.

Structure
Shigaite consists of oxycation sheets of [AlMn2+2(OH)6]1+ intercalated with oxyanion sheets of [Na(H2O)6{H2O}6(SO4)2]3−. Linkage between the sheets and within the oxyanion sheet results largely through hydrogen bonding.

History
Shigaite was discovered in 1985 in the Ioi Mine, Shiga Prefecture, Japan. The original study, published in the journal Neues Jahrbuch für Mineralogie, Monatshefte, identified the formula as Al4Mn7(SO4)2(OH)22·8H2O. The formula was significantly revised in 1996 using a sample from the N'Chwaning Mine, South Africa. Sodium, discovered to be a component of shigaite, was not identified in the original study. However, an unidentified volatile had been noted that presumably was a sodium-containing complex.

Distribution
, shigaite is known from the following sites:
Iron Monarch open cut, South Australia, Australia
Poudrette quarry, Quebec, Canada
Ioi mine, Shiga Prefecture, Japan
Wessels Mine, Northern Cape Province, South Africa
N'Chwaning Mine, Northern Cape Province, South Africa
Homer Mine, Michigan, United States
Bengal Mine, Michigan, United States

The type material is housed in the National Museum of Natural History in Washington, D.C. as sample 122089.

Association
Shigaite has been found associated with the following minerals:

Ioi mine, Japan
rhodochrosite
sonolite
manganosite
pyrochroite
jacobsite
hausmannite
galaxite

Wessels Mine, South Africa
rhodochrosite
leucophoenicite
gageite
caryopilite

Iron Monarch, South Australia
arsenoclasite
gatehouseite
hematite
hausmannite
manganoan ferroan calcite
barite
gypsum

Notes

References

Bibliography

Further reading

Sulfate minerals
Manganese(II) minerals
Aluminium minerals
Trigonal minerals
Minerals in space group 148